"Little Children" is a song written by J. Leslie McFarland and Mort Shuman, and was recorded by Billy J. Kramer & the Dakotas.

Background
The lyric concerns a man's entreaties to his girlfriend's young siblings not to reveal his courtship of their elder sister and to leave them alone, at some points, even bribing them with things like "candy and a quarter" and "a movie", on the condition that they "keep a secret". As such, it was a departure from the traditional love songs previously recorded by Kramer (sometimes supplied by Lennon & McCartney).  When offered another Lennon and McCartney song, "One and One Is Two", for his next single by the manager of both groups, Brian Epstein, Kramer turned it down and chose "Little Children" instead, after a search for suitable material from music publishers.

Chart performance
"Little Children" reached number one in the UK Singles Chart in March 1964,  and No. 7 in the US Hot 100 singles chart later the same year.  The B-side of "Little Children" in the U.S., "Bad to Me" (which had previously been an A-side in the UK which made No. 1 there in August 1963) peaked at No. 9 on the US charts simultaneously to the success of "Little Children" there.

References

Billy J. Kramer songs
1964 singles
UK Singles Chart number-one singles
Song recordings produced by George Martin
Songs with music by Mort Shuman
1964 songs
Parlophone singles
Songs written by John Leslie McFarland